Cabra de Mora is a municipality located in the province of Teruel, Aragon, Spain. According to the 2004 census (INE), the municipality had a population of 119 inhabitants. In 2018, only 55 inhabitants were living in the municipality, which has been experiencing a steady population decrease since 2007.

Demography
The following graphs show the population progression of Cabra de Mora.

Population of Cabra de Mora

Gender Distribution of Cabra de Mora

References

Municipalities in the Province of Teruel
Geography articles needing translation from Spanish Wikipedia